Jan Østergaard Jørgensen (born 31 December 1987) is a retired badminton player from Denmark who played for SIF (Skovshoved) in the Denmark badminton league. He won the men's singles title at the 2014 European Championships, and was the bronze medalist at the 2015 World Championships. He joined the Denmark winning team at the 2016 Thomas Cup in Kunshan, China.

Career 
He won the European Championship title in 2014. He won the bronze medal at the 2008 European Badminton Championships and 2012 European Badminton Championships and the silver medal at the 2010 European Badminton Championships and 2016 European Badminton Championships. He won the Danish Championship title in 2012, 2013 and again in 2015 (Withdrawn due to injury in 2014). He was the runner up at 2009 China Open Super Series and won Denmark Open in 2010, French Open (badminton) in 2013, Indonesia Open (badminton) in 2014 and the invitational Copenhagen Masters in 2009, 2011 and 2012. In 2014, he became the first European male singles player to win the Indonesia Open. In March 2015 he reached the final of the All England Super Series, but lost against Chen Long, from China, 21-15, 17-21, 15-21.

Personal life  
He is married to the Danish Handball player Stine Jørgensen and have twins together.

Achievements

BWF World Championships 
Men's singles

European Championships 
Men's singles

BWF World Tour (1 runner-up) 
The BWF World Tour, announced on 19 March 2017 and implemented in 2018, is a series of elite badminton tournaments, sanctioned by Badminton World Federation (BWF). The BWF World Tour are divided into six levels, namely World Tour Finals, Super 1000, Super 750, Super 500, Super 300 (part of the HSBC World Tour), and the BWF Tour Super 100.

Men's singles

BWF Superseries (4 titles, 5 runners-up) 
The BWF Superseries, launched on 14 December 2006 and implemented in 2007, is a series of elite badminton tournaments, sanctioned by Badminton World Federation (BWF). BWF Superseries has two level such as Superseries and Superseries Premier. A season of Superseries features twelve tournaments around the world, which introduced since 2011, with successful players invited to the Superseries Finals held at the year end.

Men's singles

  BWF Superseries Finals tournament
  BWF Superseries Premier tournament
  BWF Superseries tournament

BWF Grand Prix (2 titles) 
The BWF Grand Prix has two levels, the BWF Grand Prix and Grand Prix Gold. It is a series of badminton tournaments sanctioned by the Badminton World Federation (BWF) since 2007.

Men's singles

  BWF Grand Prix Gold tournament
  BWF Grand Prix tournament

BWF International Challenge/Series/European Circuit (4 titles, 2 runners-up) 
Men's singles

  BWF International Challenge tournament
  BWF International Series / European Circuit tournament

Record against selected opponents 
Record against year-end Finals finalists, World Championships semi finalists, and Olympic quarter finalists, accurate as of 17 March 2020.

  Chen Jin 4–4
  Chen Long 2–11
  Chen Yu 0–1
  Du Pengyu 2–3
  Lin Dan 7–9
  Shi Yuqi 0–1
  Tian Houwei 6–3
  Chou Tien-Chen 6–6
  Viktor Axelsen 3–5
  Peter Gade 3–4
  Hans-Kristian Vittinghus 5–1
  Rajiv Ouseph 10–3
  Parupalli Kashyap 4–3
  Srikanth Kidambi 2–4
  B. Sai Praneeth 2–0
  Anthony Sinisuka Ginting 4–2
  Taufik Hidayat 2–2
  Sony Dwi Kuncoro 2–0
  Tommy Sugiarto 3–1
  Kento Momota 3–5
  Sho Sasaki 3–3
  Lee Chong Wei 1–17
  Liew Daren 1–4
  Wong Choong Hann 2–1
  Lee Hyun-il 2–3
  Park Sung-hwan 2–1
  Shon Seung-mo 0–1
  Son Wan-ho 3–3
  Boonsak Ponsana 11–2
  Kantaphon Wangcharoen 1–0
  Nguyễn Tiến Minh 2–6

References

External links 

 
 Badminton Denmark Profile
 

1987 births
Living people
People from Aalborg Municipality
Danish male badminton players
Badminton players at the 2012 Summer Olympics
Badminton players at the 2016 Summer Olympics
Olympic badminton players of Denmark
Sportspeople from the North Jutland Region